Rumen Stefanov Pavlov (born 21 March 1964) is a Bulgarian wrestler. He competed in the men's freestyle 57 kg at the 1992 Summer Olympics.

References

1964 births
Living people
Bulgarian male sport wrestlers
Olympic wrestlers of Bulgaria
Wrestlers at the 1992 Summer Olympics
Sportspeople from Sliven